Hafezabad may refer to:
 Hafezabad, Kerman
 Hafezabad, Khash, Sistan and Baluchestan Province
 Hafezabad, Zahedan, Sistan and Baluchestan Province

See also
 Hafizabad, Iran (disambiguation)